Adnan Orahovac (Serbian Cyrillic: Аднан Ораховац) is a Montenegrin footballer playing for Thai League 2 club Customs United.
 Besides Montenegro, he has played in Uzbekistan and Thailand.

Club career

For FK Budućnost Podgorica, he scored his first goal to ensure a 2–1 victory over FK Mogren, endearing himself more to the fans.

In 2015, he signed for Pakhtakor Tashkent.
His first cup goal for Pakhtakor came in a match in the first leg of the 2015 Uzbekistan Cup semifinals as an equalizer, but his club still lost.

In 2017, he signed for Dinamo Samarqand.

In 2018, he signed for PT Prachuap.

In 2022 Orahovac signed for Customs United

Honours

PT Prachuap
 Thai League Cup: 2019

References

1991 births
Living people
Association football central defenders
Montenegrin footballers
FK Budućnost Podgorica players
FK Dečić players
FK Jedinstvo Užice players
Pakhtakor Tashkent FK players
FK Dinamo Samarqand players
Adnan Orahovac
Montenegrin First League players
Montenegrin Second League players
Serbian First League players
Uzbekistan Super League players
Adnan Orahovac
Montenegrin expatriate footballers
Expatriate footballers in Serbia
Montenegrin expatriate sportspeople in Serbia
Expatriate footballers in Uzbekistan
Montenegrin expatriate sportspeople in Uzbekistan
Expatriate footballers in Thailand
Montenegrin expatriate sportspeople in Thailand
Bosniaks of Montenegro